Richardsville is a small unincorporated community in Culpeper County, Virginia, United States. It is located between the Rapidan and Rappahannock rivers.

Richardsville was the site of many of Virginia's gold mines in the early 19th century. During the Civil War, a number of skirmishes and troop movements took place in Richardsville.

Unincorporated communities in Culpeper County, Virginia
Unincorporated communities in Virginia